Champagné-Saint-Hilaire is a commune in the Vienne department in the Nouvelle-Aquitaine region in western France.

Champagné-Saint-Hilaire is located in the geographical area known as the seuil du Poitou. It is also the highest commune in the vicinity.

See also
Communes of the Vienne department

References

Communes of Vienne